Novouglovsky is a rural locality (a settlement) in Uglovsky Selsoviet, Uglovsky District, Altai Krai, Russia. The population was 278 as of 2013. There are 2 streets.

Geography 
Novouglovsky is located 13 km north of Uglovskoye (the district's administrative centre) by road. Ozyorno-Kuznetsovo is the nearest rural locality.

References 

Rural localities in Uglovsky District, Altai Krai